is the fourth addition to the Yu-Gi-Oh! anime meta-series, as well as the first main spin-off series. The plot centers around Jaden Yuki and his friends, and tells of their adventures at Duel Academy, a school that teaches students how to play the card game Duel Monsters. Season one, known as the Seven Stars Saga, covers their first year at the Academy. It was broadcast by 4Kids Entertainment as simply Yu-Gi-Oh! GX.

Summary 
The first half of the season begins with Jaden arriving as a freshman and being placed into the Slifer Red dorm. Jaden makes new friends and settles into his new life at the Academy. Despite getting low grades in class, he is recognized as a strong duelist by his peers. During the second half of the season, Jaden is selected to be one of the "Keykeepers", seven duelists who are charged with the duty of preventing the powerful Sacred Beast cards from falling into evil hands. The season ends with Jaden dueling against Zane Truesdale, the top student in the school.

Episode list

References

General

Specific

2004 Japanese television seasons
2005 Japanese television seasons
GX (season 1)